Boris Komitov may refer to:
 Boris Komitov (astronomer)
 Boris Komitov (singer)